Cinzia Delisi (born 27 October 1956) is an Italian gymnast. She competed at the 1972 Summer Olympics.

References

External links
 

1956 births
Living people
Italian female artistic gymnasts
Olympic gymnasts of Italy
Gymnasts at the 1972 Summer Olympics
Sportspeople from São Paulo